David or Dave Moody may refer to:
 David Moody (writer) (born 1970), English horror writer
 David Moody (cricketer) (born 1995), Australian cricketer
 David Moody (politician) (1834–1915), South Australian politician
 Dave Moody (musician) (born 1962), American musician
 Dave Moody (sportscaster) (born 1961), American radio sportscaster

See also
 Moody (surname)